The following are the national records in track cycling in Ireland maintained by Ireland's national cycling federation: Cycling Ireland.

Men
Key to tables:

Women

References
General
Irish records October 2022 updated
Specific

External links
Cycling Ireland web site

Irish
Records
Track cycling
track cycling